Printemps (meaning "spring" (springtime) in French) may refer to:

 Printemps, a French department store
 Printemps (album), a 1998 mandopop album by Leslie Cheung
 Printemps (ballet), a 1972 U.S. ballet by Lorca Massine 
 Printemps (composition), an 1887 symphony by Claude Debussy
 Printemps (song), a 2004 electronica song by Helium Viola, from the album Liod
 Le Printemps (The Return of Spring), an 1886 painting by William-Adolphe Bouguereau
 Le Printemps (Spring), an 1881 painting by Édouard Manet, see List of paintings by Édouard Manet
 Grand Prix du Printemps (Spring grand prix race), a horse race in France
 Coupe du Printemps (Spring Cup), a figure skating competition in Luxembourg
 Yvonne Printemps (1894-1977) a French singer-actress

See also
 Au Printemps (disambiguation), French meaning "in springtime"
 Primavera (disambiguation), Italian, Spanish and Portuguese for "springtime"
 Spring (disambiguation)
 Springtime (disambiguation)